Jasov is a small town and municipality in Košice-okolie District in the Kosice Region of eastern Slovakia. It is one of several towns in Bodva Valley. Other towns in Bodva Valley include: Lucia Bania, Medzev (Metzenseifen), Vyšný Medzev (Upper Metzenseifen), and Stos.

History
Historically, the village was first mentioned in 1234.

St John The Baptist Church

This is the biggest monastery complex in Slovakia and the St John The Baptist church, which forms its centrepiece, is considered one of the country's most important late-Baroque buildings.

Though the present complex dates unquestionably from the 18th century, there has been a monastery here since 1170. The first, probably made of wood, was destroyed by the invading Tatars in 1242. A Romanesque stone monastery soon replaced it and was rebuilt in a fortified style in the 15th century. The site was then completely levelled again in the 18th century to make way for the present Baroque structure. The monastery has 365 windows, 12 chimneys and four gates (representing the days, months and seasons of the year).

Geography
It has a population of about 3,460.

Jasov lies on the edge of the Slovenský Kras, an area of dramatic limestone (or karst) landscapes. The nearby valley between Moldava nad Bodvou and Rožňava, with its wide bottom, high cliffs and a picturesque gorge (at Zádiel), is typical.

But karst landscapes are noted for what lies beneath their surface as much as what can be seen above, and the Slovenský Kras is no exception. The area is littered with cave complexes, several of them open to the public. One of these is in the hillside a short distance from the monastery at Jasov.

Twin towns
 Tura, Hungary

Genealogical resources

The records for genealogical research are available at the state archive "Statny Archiv in Kosice, Slovakia"

 Roman Catholic church records (births/marriages/deaths): 1679-1911 (parish A)
 Greek Catholic church records (births/marriages/deaths): 1870-1902 (parish B)
 Reformated church records (births/marriages/deaths): 1727-1904 (parish B)

See also
 List of municipalities and towns in Slovakia

References

External links

 http://www.jasov.sk/
 http://obecjasov.sk/
 http://www.retep.sk/okolie/jasov/jasov.php
 Spectacular Slovakia travelguide - Jasov: Spiritual and temporal symmetry
Surnames of living people in Jasov

Villages and municipalities in Košice-okolie District